Harihar Nath Shastri was an Indian politician who belonged to Indian National Congress.
He was the first Member of Parliament of Kanpur. He also actively worked as the labour leader. In the late 1920s, he was seen as communist but was considered to be moderate by the late 1930s. He was the first President of Indian National Railway Workers Federation (INRWF) in 1948. In 1925 he was recruited as a life member of the Servants of the People Society, by its founder-director, the late Lala Lajpat Rai, with whom he worked for a year as his private secretary. In 1947 he became a member of the Constituent Assembly of India, and on its dissolution became a member of the Indian Parliament.

References

Date of death unknown
Indian National Congress politicians
India MPs 1952–1957
Lok Sabha members from Uttar Pradesh
Politicians from Kanpur
1905 births
Indian National Congress politicians from Uttar Pradesh